Jenő Károly (15 January 1886 – 28 July 1926) was a Hungarian footballer and later manager born in Budapest. Outside his homeland he is particularly noted for being the first manager of Agnelli-era Juventus.

As a player, Károly appeared for two local Budapest clubs, including the powerful MTK Budapest. He was renowned for having a very high goals-to-game ratio. He also represented his country a number of times, including at the 1912 Summer Olympics.

Honours

Player

Club
MTK Budapest
 Nemzeti Bajnokság I: 1903, 1908
 Magyar Kupa: 1910

Individual
MTK Budapest
 Nemzeti Bajnokság I Topscorer: 1903, 1905

References

MTK Budapest FC players
Hungarian footballers
Footballers at the 1912 Summer Olympics
Hungarian football managers
Juventus F.C. managers
1886 births
1926 deaths
Association football forwards
Hungary international footballers
Footballers from Budapest